Mike Tamburo, also known as Brother Ong (born 30 March 1977 New Kensington, Pennsylvania) is an independent musician, sound explorer, music educator, filmmaker, musical instrument builder, interdisciplinary sound artist, gong enthusiast, storyteller, writer, meditation teacher, installation artist, painter, currently living in New Kensington, PA. He is a well known multi-instrumentalist and plays the hammered dulcimer, gong, shahi baaja, swarmandal, autoharp, the crowned eternal (an instrument he built out of a headboard), tuning forks, guitar, percussion, electronic instruments, bulbul tarang, bass gopichand, gulbulgar, singing bowls, bells and clarinet.  He runs 2 small labels called: New American Folk Hero and Sounds Eternal. He teaches Kundalini yoga, Nāda yoga, sound therapy and Experimental Instrument Building. Early in Tamburo's career he gained notoriety for his string playing (hammered dulcimer, guitar and shahi baaja).  In many of his early performances he began to enter into altered states of consciousness and have out of body experiences while performing.  In order to understand these experiences he went into years of self study; exploring Kundalini Yoga, energy work, the therapeutic use of sound and how sound effects consciousness, human perception and self healing. His love for long sustained overtones and psychoacoustics led him to working with multiple gongs and other tuned metal instruments (bells, sound plates, singing bowls) as well as exploring the healing power of mantra and toning. He has traveled the United States extensively, performing over 1500 shows in his career. He writes about many of his adventures in an ongoing collection of stories called Without Beginning, Middle Or End. He has also curated 3 years of the Fantastic Voyagers Music Festival. He performed and recorded for several years with Crown Of Eternity with his ex-wife Galina Haralambava.

Past and Current Projects 
Mike Tamburo - (1993-current)
Brother Ong (2010-current)
Crown Of Eternity (2010-2018) with Galina Haralambava
Kukeri (2009-2012) with Gallina Tamburo, Chris Niels, Michael Dodin
In The Belly Of The Whale (2008-2009) with Darren Myers, Ryan Emmett, Ian Bonnet and Jeffrey Alexander
A Collaboration (2008-2009) with Mike Kasunic and Josh Beyer
Natura Nasa (2005-2006) with Pete Spynda, Darren Myers, Ian Bonnet
Psychic Frost (2002-current) with Matt Mcdowell
Arco Flute Foundation (1999-2003) with Matt Mcdowell, Pete Spynda, Rob Dingman and Jeff Komara
Meisha (1996-2001) with Ken Camden and Pete Spynda
Ennui (1996) with Dave Blair
Eskimo 88 (1993-1995) with Christopher Pecoraro

Discography (as of 2013) 

As Brother Ong

 9th Church Of The Ascended Astronaut - Cassette {Sounds Eternal = 2013} 
 Aquarian Summer Cassette, Lathe Cut {Sounds Eternal = 2013}
 Deep Water Creation CDR (Deep Water Acres - 2012)
 Mysteries of the Shahi Baaja - 2CD (Sounds Eternal - 2012)
 Elenin - CDR (Sounds Eternal - 2012)
 The Architect - CDR Single (Sounds Eternal - 2012)
 Deep Water Creation - CDR (Deep Water Acres - 2011)
 The Golden Ray - CDR Comp/Digital single (NNN /Sounds Eternal Digital - 2011)

As Mike Tamburo

 Lives On Air - Digital (Sounds Eternal - 2012)
 Another View Of The Gate - CDR (Perhaps Transparent - 2010)
 The Tenth Gate and Other Revelations Box Set - 6 CDR + Book (NAFH - 2009)
 In The District Of Noise - CDR (New American Folk Hero - 2009)
 The Tenth Gate / Alchemical Marriage - 2CDR (NAFH - 2009)
 Vitvivatora - CDR (NAFH - 2008)
 Language Of The Birds And Other Fantasies Box - 7 CDRS, DVDR + Book (NAFH - 2007)
 Dance Enis Dance - CDR (Barl Fire - 2007)
 Ghosts of Marumbey - CD (Music Fellowship - 2006)
 Beating of the Rewound Son - CD (Music Fellowship - 2005)
 Screwing Six Bolts Into Last Tuesday - CD (NAFH - 2005)
 Jade Is The Color Of My True Love’s Fate - CDR (NAFH - 2005)
 On A - Cassette (Less=More - 1995)
 How Can I Help You Help Me - Cassette (Less=More - 1995)

Psychic Frost (Collaborations with Matt Mcdowell)

 Taking Lizard Mountain (By Frequency) - CDR (Deep Water Acres - 2013)
 Hey Enis Dance/Taste the Frost - CDR (Deep Water Acres - 2011)
 Are We Not Drawn Onward To New Era? - Cassette (Sloow Tapes - 2007)
 At Bohemian Grove - CDR (Rural Faune - 2007)
 Chaob - CDR (Also with Adam Forkner and Honey Owens) (Foxglove - 2007)
 God Will Fail John’s Horn - 3” (NAFH - 2006)
 Searching for Augie Leonard Sr. - CD (NAFH - 2006)
 The Uncontrollable Mr. Lechte on Strands Formerly Braided - 3way split CD (MF-2006)

Arco Flute Foundation

 Everything After Everything After The Bomb Is Sci-Fi - CD (Music Fellowship - 2005)
 Everything After The Bomb Is Sci-Fi - CD (Cenotaph Audio - 2002)
 I Ate Tony Conrad’s Pierogies - CDR (Tour Only -  2001)
 The Fifth Lesson in New Era Time: The Unconsciousness of Yukon Steve - CDR (Drone Disco - 2001) 
 The Third Lesson in New Era Time: Running Slow Motion Marathons with Purple Rejoice; Who Killed the Party House? - CD (Cenotaph Audio - 2000)
 The Second Lesson in New Era Time: Exploring the Possibilities of New Wave Villains; And What of Boy? - LP (Cenotaph Audio - 2000)

Meisha

 For Sayas - CD (NAFH - 2005)
 The Secret Of Paul Grouper - CD (NAFH - 2005) 
 The First Lesson In New Era Time - The Universal Orchestra Of Pituitary Knowledge Sing Om To The Disturbed Onlookers, Who Were Meisha And Robin Anyway? - CD (Music Foray Two - 2001)
 The Fourth Lesson In New Era Time - Redefining The Sixty Foot Rock Band; The Deaf Will Still Feel Our Vibrations OR Republic Of Meisha  - 7” (Pop Bus - 2000) 
 On A Clear Day You Can See Forever (1 Side of Pieces Of A Utopian Puzzle 3LP) (Priapus - 2000)
 A Celebration Of Life - CDR (Gingkoba - 1999)
 Meisha Returns Meisha Forever - CD (Music Fellowship - 1999)
 Meisha - CD (Gingkoba - 1997)

Mike Tamburo and Wilson Lee
 Boyinger - 2x3" (NAFH - 2006)

Mike Tamburo and Ken Camden
 Of Meisha (NAFH - 2006)

Eskimo 88
 
 Inside Outside - Cassette (Less=More - 1995)
 Open Your Ears and Hear a Sound - Cassette (Less=More - 1994)

Compilations Appearances

 For Lee Jackson In Space (LEE - 2012)
 Fantastic Voyagers 3 (NAFH - 2010)
 Fantastic Voyagers 2 (NAFH - 2008)
 Fantastic Voyagers 1 (NAFH - 2007)
 FRANNCE compilation (Rural Faune - 2007 )
 Ball of Wax 9 (Ball Of Wax -  2007) 
 Go Down Slow - Music For Acoustic Guitar (Harha Askel -2006)
 Unicorn Mountain 2 - 2006 
 Gold Leaf Branches (Digitalis - 2005) 
 Radio CPR Compilation (Sockets - 2005)

Reviews and Interviews
Work and Worry Magazine Interview May 2012
Terrascope Online
Mr. Atavist
Terrascope Online
Foxy Digitalis
Vision Quest Cover Of Pittsburgh City Paper May 2009

American folk musicians
Living people
1977 births
People from New Kensington, Pennsylvania